Sellindge is a civil parish and village on the A20 road between Ashford and Folkestone in Kent, South East England. Sellindge is part of North Downs West Ward of Folkestone and Hythe District Council but part of the Elham ward of Kent County Council.

Since 1971 the yearly Sellindge Steam Festival or Folkestone & Ashford Military Show has been held in the village. In 2008 and 2009 the Sellindge Music Festival was held in the village.

The static inverter plant of HVDC Cross-Channel lies south of the motorway on Church Lane. Plans exist for a 3,000 capacity lorry park and an anaerobic digestion plant. They are also planning to build a new town called Otterpool, many of the residents want this to happen.

Sport & Leisure
The village has a sports and social club and a village hall. Sellindge has to its northern side the Kent North Downs. The village has one public house, The Duke's Head, and a small shopping area. There is also a church.

In popular culture

Author Russell Hoban repurposes Sellindge as "Sel Out" in his 1980, post apocalyptic novel Riddley Walker.

References

External links

 VillageNet entry for Sellindge
 Sellindge Parish Council

Villages in Kent
Villages in the Borough of Ashford
Civil parishes in Kent